Kargil  or Kargyil
is a city and a joint capital of the union territory of Ladakh, India. It is also the headquarters of the Kargil district. It is the second-largest city in Ladakh after Leh. It is on the bank of the Suru River near its confluence with the Wakha Rong river, the latter providing the most accessible route to Leh.

Etymology
The word can be interpreted as meaning a bright or wholesome expanse.

It can also be interpreted as a bright or wholesome mountainous amphitheatre. This phrase occurs often in Tibetan literature.

The Kargil basin does give the feel of an expanse surrounded by low-pitched mountains, with the low Khurbathang plateau at the southeastern corner. This is in sharp contrast to the deep gorges that give access to the valley.

The people of Kargil however relate the name to Khar (fort) and rkil (centre) and interpret it as a central place among many forts.
Radhika Gupta has opined that it is a fitting description for a place that is equidistant from Srinagar, Leh and Skardu.

Location

Kargil is located at the confluence of multiple river valleys: the Suru River valley to the north and south, the Wakha Rong valley to the southeast leading to Leh, and the Sod Valley to the east leading to the Indus Valley near Batalik. In addition, at a short distance to the north, the Dras River valley branches off from the Suru valley leading to the Zoji La pass and Kashmir. Further north along the Suru valley, one reaches the Indus valley, leading to Skardu. Thus, Kargil is located at a key junction of routes between Kashmir, Ladakh and Baltistan.

Scholar Janet Rizvi states that the Indus Valley between Marol and Dah is a narrow gorge and was not easily traversable in the pre-modern period. So the normal trade route between Baltistan and Leh also ran via Kargil, using the Suru valley and Wakha Rong.

After the Partition of India and the First Kashmir War, Baltistan came under the control of Pakistan. Peak 13620 overlooking Kargil town and the Srinagar–Leh Highway remained in Pakistani control at the end of this conflict. During the Indo-Pakistan War of 1971, Indian forces pushed the Line of Control north of the ridgeline, ensuring Kargil's security. A key village called Hunderman came under Indian control as a result of this push.

History
The Sod Valley had a strong fort called Sod Pasari (now known as Pasar Khar) by the 16th or 17th century. It controlled "Lower Purig", including the Sod Valley, the lower portion of Wakha Rong and, likely the Kargil basin itself. By the 18th or 19h century, it also had a sub-branch at Pashkum southeast of Kargil town in the Wakha Rong valley.

Dogra period 

During Zorawar Singh's invasion of Ladakh in 1834, the Dogras attacked both these forts and destroyed them. Afterwards, Zorawar Singh stationed a Kardar (administrator) for Kargil and Drass, and probably built a fort at Kargil for this purpose. In 1838, the people of the region revolted against the Dogras and the killed the Kardar.

In 1840, after another rebellion in Ladakh, Zorawar Singh deposed the Gyalpo and annexed Ladakh. He also decided to invade Baltistan. On the way to Baltistan, he made a detour to Sod, routed the rebels and, according to the Dogra narrative, "annexed" the whole of Purig. He appointed kardars for Drass and Suru.

After Zorawar Singh's death in Tibet, there was another rebellion in Ladakh and Purig. But Dogras sent fresh forces under Wazir Lakhpat, who beat back the Tibetans and reestablished status quo ante. On returning, the Wazir garrisoned the Kargil fort and took all the Rajas of the region as prisoners.

Alexander Cunningham described the Kargil fort as a square of about sixty yards on the left bank of the Suru River immediately above its junction with Wakha Rong. It was able to defend the bridge over the Suru River and completely command the Kashmir–Ladakh road.

In 1854, there were three ilaqas (subdistrics) in the present day Kargil distric, at Kargil, Dras and Zanskar respectively. They were headed by civil officers called Thanadars. It would appear that the growth of Kargil as an administrative centre and a town owes to this establishment.

During the reign of Pratap Singh, a wazarat (district) was established for all the frontier regions (including Gilgit), and Kargil was made a tehsil of the wazarat. Sometime later, Gilgit was separated, and Kargil, Skardu and Leh made up the Ladakh wazarat. The district headquarters shifted between the three locations each year.

Independent India 

The First Kashmir War (1947–48) concluded with a ceasefire line that divided the Ladakh wazarat, putting roughly the Kargil and Leh tehsils on the Indian side, and the Skardu tehsil on the Pakistan side. The two Indian tehsils were soon promoted to districts and Ladakh was named a division, on a par with the Jammu and Kashmir divisions in the Indian state of Jammu and Kashmir. Pakistan renamed the Skardu tehsil Baltistan and divided it into further districts.

At the end of Indo-Pakistani War of 1971, the two nations signed the Simla Agreement, converting the former ceasefire line with some adjustments into a Line of Control, and promising not to engage in armed conflict with respect to that boundary.

In 1999 the area saw infiltration by Pakistani forces, leading to the Kargil War. Fighting occurred along a 160 km long stretch of ridges overlooking the only road linking Srinagar and Leh. The military outposts on the ridges above the highway were generally around 5,000 metres (16,000 ft) high, with a few as high as 5,485 metres (18,000 ft). After several months of fighting and diplomatic activity, the Pakistani forces were forced to withdraw to their side of the Line of Control by their Prime minister Nawaz Sharif after he visited the USA.

Geography

Kargil has an average elevation of 2,676 metres (8,780 feet), and is situated along the banks of the Suru River (Indus).
Like other areas in the Himalayas, Kargil has a temperate climate. Summers are hot with cool nights, while winters are long and chilly with temperatures often dropping below −20 °C (−4 °F).

Demographics
During the 2011 census, the population of Kargil town was recorded at 16,338. A majority of the population (11,496) is classified as Scheduled Tribes. The literacy rate is 75%.

Religion
Islam is the largest religion in Kargil City, followed by over 77.56% of people. Hinduism is the second-largest religion with 19.21% adherents. Buddhism and Sikhism form 0.54% and 2.2% of the population respectively.

Media and communications
All India Radio's channel AIR Kargil AM 684 is broadcast from a radio station at Kargil. Greater Ladakh is the largest circulated bi-lingual newspaper in the Union Territory that publishes once in a week.

Transportation

Air
Kargil Airport is a non-operational airport located 8 kilometres from the town. The airport is included in UDAN scheme and is proposed to be operational in the near future. The nearest operational airport is the Srinagar International Airport.

Rail
There is no rail-connectivity to Kargil yet. The Srinagar-Kargil-Leh railway line is proposed which will connect Srinagar and Leh via Kargil. The nearest major railway station to Kargil is Jammu Tawi railway station located at a distance of 472 kilometres.

Road
An Indian national highway (NH 1) connecting Srinagar to Leh cuts through Kargil.

Kargil-Skardu Road
The all-weather Kargil-Skardu road once linked Kargil to Skardu, a city in Gilgit-Baltistan. Since the 1948 Kashmir War, the road has been closed. Whilst the Indian Government has proposed opening the road as a humanitarian gesture, the Pakistani government has refused.

See also
 Kargil War
 Ladakh
 Leh
 Jammu and Kashmir (state) 
 Jammu and Kashmir (union territory)
 1988 Gilgit massacre

Notes

References

Bibliography

Further reading

External links

 Kargil Official Website

 
Cities and towns in Kargil district
Hill stations in Ladakh
Indian union territory capitals
Geography of Ladakh